Wilson Portal is a coastal mountain rising over 1,000 m, which is snow-covered except for its north steep rock face. Spurs descend northeast from the feature. It stands 2.5 nautical miles (4.6 km) southeast of O'Leary Peak and overlooks the west side of the mouth (or portal) of Kosco Glacier where the latter enters Ross Ice Shelf. Discovered and photographed by United States Antarctic Service (USAS) (1939–41) and surveyed by A.P. Crary (1957–58). Named by Crary for Charles R. Wilson, chief aurora scientist at Little America V (1958) and glaciologist of the U.S. Victoria Land Traverse Party (1958–59).

References

Mountains of the Ross Dependency
Dufek Coast